Orville is a commune in the Pas-de-Calais department in the Hauts-de-France region of France.

Geography

History
In the early 20th century, the village of Orville was home to more than a thousand people, among them more than 500 Belgian workers who had been attracted by the presence of phosphate mines. The discovery of phosphates could be compared at the time to the gold rush of America's far-west. There were up to 30 quarries extracting the phosphate-rich sand.
The phosphate mines that had been discovered in 1887 were in use until the beginning of the 20th century, when richer and cheaper Moroccan and Tunisian imports became available. Extraction of sand for building and other use was still operating in the 1970s.
The present name of this site is "the buttes of Orville" and is currently used as an international renowned clay pigeon shooting ground.

Population

Places of interest
 The church of St.Martin, dating from the nineteenth century.
 The watermill on the river Authie.
 Two 18th-century farmhouses.
 Dovecotes.

See also
Communes of the Pas-de-Calais department

References

Communes of Pas-de-Calais